This is a list of members of the 16th Lok Sabha (2014-2019), arranged by state-wise and union territory-wise representation in Lok sabha. These members of the Lower house of the Indian Parliament were elected in the 2014 Indian general election held from 7 April to 12 May 2014.

Andhra Pradesh
Keys:

Arunachal Pradesh
Keys:

Assam
Keys:

Bihar
Keys:

Chhattisgarh
Keys:

Goa
Keys:

Gujarat
Keys:

Haryana
Keys:

Himachal Pradesh
Keys:

Jammu and Kashmir
Keys:

Jharkhand
Keys:

Karnataka
Keys:

Kerala
Keys:

Madhya Pradesh
Keys:

Maharashtra
Keys:

Manipur
Keys:

Meghalaya
Keys:

Mizoram
Keys:

Nagaland
Keys:

Odisha
Keys:

Punjab
Keys:

Rajasthan
Keys:

Sikkim
Keys:

Tamil Nadu
Keys:

Telangana
Keys:

Tripura
Keys:

Uttar Pradesh
Keys:

Uttarakhand
Keys:

West Bengal
Keys:

Andaman and Nicobar Islands
Keys:

Chandigarh
Keys:

Dadra and Nagar Haveli
Keys:

Daman and Diu
Keys:

NCT of Delhi
Keys:

Lakshadweep
Keys:

Puducherry
Keys:

Nominated
Keys:

See also
 Member of parliament, Lok Sabha
 List of members of the 15th Lok Sabha
 List of members of the 17th Lok Sabha

References

 List of Member of Parliament of 16th Lok Sabha

List
16